Ahmad Babba Kaita is a Nigerian senator. He was a member of the Nigerian House of Representatives, representing the Congress for Progressive Change in the Kankia/Ingawa/Kusada constituency of Katsina State, Nigeria. He became a representative in 2011.

Background 
Kaita was born on 9 August 1968, and is of Hausa and Fulani origin. He did his primary education at Sada Primary School in Kankia between 1974 and 1980. He did his Qur'anic recitation from his father, and later attended his secondary education in Kufena College Wusasa Zaria Kaduna State between 1980 and 1985. He obtained his BSc in sociology from Bayero University Kano in 1992 and thereafter participate his national youth service corp in Port Harcourt in 1994 and 1995. After his service Kaita worked for Splendid International Limited, one of the Nigerian oil and gas companies, for 15 years where he rose to the position of managing director. He also worked for Everglades Agencies Limited before joining partisan politics.

Early political career
Babba Kaita passion for his people motivated him to contest election in 2011 to the House of Representatives to represent the people of Kankia, Ingawa, Kusada federal constituency of Katsina State which he won. He was elected on the platform of Congress for Progressive Change (C.P.C.) which later merged with other parties to form All Progressives Congress (A.P.C.) in 2014. He was re-elected in 2015 under the platform of (A.P.C.) he sponsored several bills in the House among which are Terrorism act (amendment) bill 2016 Small and medium scale enterprises development agency act (amendment) bill 2016 and other bills. He also serve as chairman house committee on housing and also chairman house committee on defense.

Senator
Ahmad Babba Kaita was elected to the 8th Senate for Katsina North in 2018 to fill the vacuum in the senatorial zone following the unfortunate demise of senator Mustapha Bukar. In 2019 Kaita was re-elected again defeated his opponent Hon Usman Mani from Peoples Democratic Party P.D P with the total vote of 339,438 . He is one of the most influential senator in the 9th assembly chairing the committee TETFUND and tertiary institution and vice chairman Senate committee on ethnics, privileges and public petition as well as member of several committee. Since his election into national assembly, senator Kaita legislative activities are driven by a rare passion and his zeal to ensure national unity, youth employment, community development, education reforms, and poverty eradication. Senator Kaita sponsored several bills which included and not limited to (a) A bill for local government autonomy.(b) bill for the rename of federal polytechnic Daura to Mustapha Bukar to honor late senator.

Constituency projects
Senator Kaita has constituency projects spread across the three senatorial districts of Katsina State. He was the senator that was always struggling for his people and the nation since he emerged as the senator of Federal government of Nigeria. Senator Kaita alone has facilitated more than 100 intervention projects across the three senatorial Districts of Katsina State. The projects mostly are construction of class rooms, primary health care, communication centers, E-library, electrification of rural areas and construction of motorized boreholes were delivered to the residents of selected communities for their need, Kaita created job opportunities for youths of the state to ensure that qualified individuals from the state were not left out. Some of the constituency project are construction of class rooms blocks across the state for 6000 students across the 12 local government and construction of hundred of thousands hand pump boreholes and provision 80 transformers across his senatorial zones he also established of federal fire service training institution Kankia and federal polytechnic Daura and others.

Awards and recognition
2020, peace achievers international award of excellence leadership prowess justice and equity by achievers international.
2021, iconic senator award.
2020 NAKATS presented Award of excellence to Senator Kaita.
Democracy Heroes Award Africa 2021is set to hold it 9th edition themed "unity the alternative for peace.

References 

1968 births
Living people
Nigerian politicians